The Grace Kern House is a house located in southwest Portland, Oregon, listed on the National Register of Historic Places.

See also
 National Register of Historic Places listings in Southwest Portland, Oregon

References

1955 establishments in Oregon
Herman Brookman buildings
Houses completed in 1955
Houses on the National Register of Historic Places in Portland, Oregon
Neoclassical architecture in Oregon
Southwest Portland, Oregon